Morning Raga is a 2004 Indian musical drama film written and directed by Mahesh Dattani, and produced by K. Raghavendra Rao under Arka Media Works. It stars Shabana Azmi, Prakash Kovelamudi, Perizaad Zorabian, Lillete Dubey and Nassar. The film has an extensive use of English dialogue, in addition to Godavari dialect of Telugu language.

The film focuses on three main characters — all Telugu — whose lives have each been ruined by past tragedies and how they are united by circumstance. These three are all connected by a love of music, and through this the film explores elements of classical Indian Carnatic music, the raga, and contemporary Indian music. The film was also dubbed into Telugu as Ragam.

Plot
The film begins with a collage of idealised village life in south India, with a Carnatic classical song in the background, being rendered by Swarnalata (Shabana Azmi), the lady of a prosperous land-owning family. Abhinay (Prakash Kovelamudi) is the youthful son of another affluent land-owning family belonging to the same village. His parents are dead, and he is heir to his grandfather (Nasser), who owns extensive farmlands and property. Abhinav is not keen on the life of a land-owner. He has grown up in the city, and wants to start a music troupe, playing the western pop music which is entirely alien to this society.

It is the death anniversary of Abhinav's parents, and his grandfather performs the usual Hindu ceremonies on the riverbank, like every year. This time, after many years, Abhinav is with him. As they arrive at the riverbank, a lady who has just finished performing the same rituals is leaving. This is Swarnalatha, and when she sees a young boy with Nasser, she looks intensely at the young man. Abhinav is intrigued by her look, and after some hesitation, he leaves his grandfather and follows the lady through the village streets. A car suddenly appears and almost crashes into a distracted and careless Abhinav, but swerves away in the nick of time and hits some bushes. This incident causes great and visible trauma to Swarnalatha, who now runs homeward. Abhinav, who has fallen on his face, is unable to follow her further. He meets the driver of the car, the beautiful and strikingly modern city girl Pinky (Perizaad Zorabian). The car having broken down, Pinky has nowhere to stay the village; Abhinav takes her home, where his grandfather (Nasser) invites her to stay a few days while her car is repaired.

Swarnalatha is a classically trained Carnatic singer who lost her son and best friend, Vaishnavi ( Ranjani Ramakrishnan ) in a bus accident. The story reopens after a period of 20 years, when Vaishnavi's son, plans to leave his business of composing jingles with a desire to start a music troupe to compose an everlasting music just like the Charminar, and with these plans returns to his home in his village. His plan irks his father Nassar who wants him to look after the ancestral lands in the village. On the day of Death Anniversary of Vaishnavi, Abhinay spots Swarnalatha, and hears her song "Pibare Ramarasam" in the temple. When Swarnalatha leaves the temple, Abhinay stops her, saying, "you knew my mother" and follows her. The duo reach the bridge when a car comes and hits Abhinay, and the car was being driven by Pinky (Perizaad Zorabian). Swarnalatha screams and reaches her home, with the 20 years old guilt in her mind that her one step on the bridge caused the accident. Here, the Car gets some glitch and Pinky is compelled to stay for the night in the village. Next morning both Abhinay and Pinky set for Hyderabad to seek the perfect artists for the proposed troop, and they get a guitarist and a drummer Balaji Shaleen Sharma. All land up at Pinky's boutique whose environment irritates Abhinay but somehow Pinky consoles him and the practices start, with a few opportunities coming up their way, but their rock-band does not receive the respect as Abhinay had expected. After a few days Abhinay receives the violin his mother used to play when she was alive. He returns to the village to return the violin to Swarnalatha, saying that both her voice and the sound of the violin are complementary to each other and one cannot exist without one another, and invites her to sing with their troop, for which she refuses saying that she won't come to the village and returns the violin. Swarnalatha's husband asks him to bring his troop to the house on Ganesh Chaturthi day. The troop arrives on the said date and Swarnalatha starts singing "Mahaganapathi Manasa Smarami", but stops in between and sings the sophisticated sargam of the song, for which no compatible music could be played. That evening Abhinay again compels Swarnalatha to sing in the city, but she again refuses, and Abhinay ends the communication with the note that She owes him a lot as he is her best friend's son, after all. Next morning Abhinay's father expresses his dislike in his son's musical career in front of Swarnalatha, and at the same time Swarnalatha agrees to sing for Abhinay in the city. She starts from her house with her husband. On the way their car breaks down and they are forced to take the bus, which crosses the bridge. Swarnalatha starts screaming, stops the bus and starts running and falls ill. Both return to home and her husband reports that she cannot come for singing. Next day Swarnalatha personally calls pinky and asks her to learn Carnatic Music. Pinky learns carnatic music from Swarnalatha. After a few days Abhinay plans a concert, though for Pinky to sing but always urges Swarnalatha to come for singing, but she continues to express her reluctance because she considers the bridge as a punishment for her ambitions. One day, while driving, Pinky gets irked at the repetitive reluctance of Swarnalatha, and speeds up the car and crosses the bridge, and Swarna starts screaming, "Stop the car! We all are going to die". Finally Pinky stops the car and reveals that her father was drunk and was responsible for the accident. The film ends with the concert in which Swarnalatha appears and sings "Thaaye Yashoda" on repeated urging from Pinky, and the concert becomes a 10-week hit.

A side plot involving Pinky and her city slicker mother (Lillete Dubey) and the villager Appa Rao(Dharmavarapu Subramanyam) with his buffalo Annapoorna add comedy into an otherwise serious and thoughtful film. The film was photographed by Rajiv Menon and edited by A. Sreekar Prasad. Music was composed by Mani Sharma.

Cast
Shabana Azmi as Swarnalata
Prakash Kovelamudi as Abhinay
Perizaad Zorabian as Pinky
Lilette Dubey as Pinky's mother
Nassar as Abhinay's father
Dharmavarapu Subramanyam as Appa Rao
Shaleen Sharma as Balaji
Ranjani Ramakrishnan as Vaishnavi
Vivek Mashru as Munna
Thalaivasal Vijay

Production
Shabana Azmi  was trained intensively in Carnatic music  by Ranjani Ramakrishnan before she was allowed to sing during the film. The house used for her character's home is a historic zamindar country mansion and estate near the West Godavari village of Kulla. Shobu Yarlagadda and Prasad Devineni of Arka Media Works were line producers for the movie.

Reception
The film received mixed reviews, although the actors generally earned praise for their portrayals.

One film critic wrote that, "Morning Raga is one of the most innovative and fresh films to come out of India in recent years".
Others criticized it for having a mangled storyline that was as contrived as the rock-layered carnatic soundtrack.

Soundtrack

References

External links

2004 films
English-language Indian films
Films scored by Mani Sharma
Films set in Andhra Pradesh
Films shot in Andhra Pradesh
Films about music and musicians
Films about singers
Indian musical drama films
Films about ideologies
2000s English-language films